The Kongora Coal Mine is a coal mine located in the Tomislavgrad municipality, Canton 10, Federation of Bosnia and Herzegovina. The mine has coal reserves amounting to 206.4 million tonnes of lignite, one of the largest coal reserves in Europe and the world. The mine has an annual production capacity of 0.4 million tonnes of coal.
Power plant construction to utilize Kongora lignite deposit is under considereation.

References 

Coal mines in Bosnia and Herzegovina
Canton 10